= Taimi Piin-Aaspõllu =

Estonian mycologist

Taimi Piin-Aaspõllu (3 September 1940 – 2 September 2012) was an Estonian mycologist.

She has described the following taxon:

- Biatorella contigua N.S.Golubk. & Piin
